Cory Wade Vance (born June 20, 1979) is a former Major League Baseball pitcher who played for the Colorado Rockies from  to .

Amateur career
Vance attended George Tech and in 1998 and 1999, he played collegiate summer baseball with the Falmouth Commodores of the Cape Cod Baseball League. This performance earned him an Atlantic Coast Conference All-Star selection, and he was also named a 3rd team College All-American.

Professional career
He was drafted by the Colorado Rockies in the 4th round of the 2000 Major League Baseball Draft. He had a 1.12 ERA in 24 innings with Low-A Portland to finish the 2000 season. Vance also appeared in 2 games for the major league team after a September call up. He has the distinction of being in the mound when Rickey Henderson stole his 1406th base of his career on Vance's a pick up throw to first base. Henderson, then with the Los Angeles Dodgers, beat first baseman Todd Helton's throw to second base for the final stolen base of his career in a 2003 game between the Rockies and Dodgers. Vance played 8 games with the Rangers' Triple-A team in Oklahoma in 2004 before his career ended.

References

Personal life
Today Cory serves the City of Casa Grande (AZ) Fire Department and holds the rank of Engineer. He has been a firefighter with the City of Casa Grande Fire Department since March 2008. He lives with his wife and two daughters in the Phoenix Metro area.

External links

1979 births
Living people
Baseball players from Dayton, Ohio
Major League Baseball pitchers
Colorado Rockies players
Carolina Mudcats players
Colorado Springs Sky Sox players
Oklahoma RedHawks players
Georgia Tech Yellow Jackets baseball players
Falmouth Commodores players